Robert Jacek Kostecki (born 31 March 1969 in Krasnystaw) is a Polish former wrestler who competed in the 1992 and 1996 Summer Olympics.

References

1969 births
Living people
Olympic wrestlers of Poland
Wrestlers at the 1992 Summer Olympics
Wrestlers at the 1996 Summer Olympics
Polish male sport wrestlers
People from Krasnystaw
Sportspeople from Lublin Voivodeship